Kang Jeongildang (1772-1832), was a Korean poet.

Kang Jeongildang's real name is Kang Ji-deok (강지덕, 姜至德) and was born into the Jinju Kang clan (진주 강씨, 晉州 姜氏) in Jecheon, Chungcheong Province.

At the age of 19, she married the scholar Yun Gwang-yeon (尹光演, 윤광연; 1778–1838) in 1791. The couple had 5 sons and four daughters but they all died prematurely. Because of their poverty, her spouse could not afford to work for their support and study at the same time, so she supported them both by knitting while he studied. In parallel, she composed many poems of her own. She soon inherited the writing methods of Hwang Un-jo (황운조) and many others, and was able to write a good book, and she also showed excellent abilities in poetry and scriptures.

After her death, her widower, who respected her literary work, published her collected works in Jeongildang-yugo (정일당유고, 靜一堂遺稿; 1836), containing 150 writings, among them 38 poems and 82 letters.

She is buried in Geumto-dong (Siheung-dong), Sujeong-gu, Seongsam-si, Gyeonggi Province.

References
 Lee Bae-yong: Women in Korean History 한국 역사 속의 여성들
 Sungmoon Kim: The Way to Become a Female Sage: Im Yunjidang's Confucian Feminism
 Youngmin Kim & Michael J. Pettid: Women and Confucianism in Choson Korea: New Perspectives
 Hai-soon Lee,Hye-sun Yi: The Poetic World of Classic Korean Women Writers, Volym 9

1772 births
1832 deaths
Korean women poets
18th-century Korean women writers
19th-century Korean women writers
18th-century Korean poets
19th-century Korean poets